The 2013 season is B.G. Sports Club's 1st season in the Dhivehi League.

Month by Month review

November
BG completed their first signing for the upcoming 2013 Dhivehi League season, Mohamed Shaffaz of Victory Sports Club for one year. BG also completed the signing of VB Addu FC's defenders Ahmed Ashfan, Faruhad Ismail and Club Eagles' striker Ahmed Rilwan and goalkeeper Mohamed Yamaan. Maldives national football team player Ashad Ali, who signed to New Radiant from VB Addu FC for the 2013 season was also released to BG under his request to the New Radiant management. He signed a one-year deal with the club.

December
BG agreed to sell Maldives national under-23 football team defender Ahmed Nooman to Club Eagles. BG started strengthening their team by signing New Radiant young striker Mohamed Imran and midfielder Mohamed Hussain, VB Addu FC's Adam Fazeeh, Victory's defender Ibrahim Sinaz and Valencia goalkeeper Ibrahim Ifrah Areef. Moreover, Vyansa's Ahmed Zaad and Mazhar Abdulla also completed their signing to BG.

January
BG confirmed that Mohamed Shaazly will continue coaching to the club, and appointed Victory's former player and Club Eagles' former assistant coach Ismail Anil as the assistant coach.

Transfers

In

Pre-season

Out

Pre-season

Competitions

Overall

Last updated: 1 January 2013Source: Competitions

References

2013 in Maldivian football
Football in the Maldives